Kotwa is a village in Allahabad, Uttar Pradesh, India.

References

Villages in Allahabad district